Southern Preparatory Academy is a private military school located in Camp Hill, Alabama for boys in grades 6-12.  The Academy emphasizes academic achievement, leadership, and character development. It was formerly known as Lyman Ward Military Academy.

History 
Dr. Lyman Ward founded the Academy in 1898 as a non-profit, non-denominational, all-male institution for the rural youth of Alabama. The school is located about 20 miles from Auburn. The original purpose was to provide a secondary education for those with the ability to learn, the willingness to work, and in turn better themselves.
In 1901, the State of Alabama granted Ward a charter incorporating the school with the name,  The Southern Industrial Institute, Inc.

In 1948, Ward's passing led to the establishment of a military department. The school then changed its name to Lyman Ward Military Academy in honor of its founder. At this time, the school also ended its elementary and co-ed programs.

In 1966, the school became a member of the JROTC program and is currently assigned a retired officer and NCO by the Department of Army.

In 1972, the school received its first accreditation from the Southern Association of Colleges and Schools, which it maintains to this day.

In 2019, Lyman Ward Military Academy changed its name to Southern Preparatory Academy and remains a JROTC honor unit of distinction. The Academy is focused on college preparation and has added new programs to include drone certification and private pilot training and a flight simulator, scuba, and wielding.

Campus 
The historic Tallapoosa Hall is constructed of wood.

Interesting Events 
In March 2005, Lyman Ward Military Academy was sued for alleged abuse. There were eight lawsuits alleging brutal hazing and abuse by senior cadets and school officials.

In August 2006, lightning struck and destroyed the Dixon All-Faith Chapel. The chapel was rebuilt it in 2014.

In October 2007, Tallapoosa Hall was added to Alabama's Historic Landmarks register by the Alabama Historical Commission. The AHC certificate is currently displayed in Tallapoosa Hall's reception room.

Admissions 

The Academy accepts middle school and high school students preparing for college and other career fields, including trade school and the military. Many of these applicants are attempting to improve their academic standing and study habits. Applications for admissions are accepted year-round. New cadets are admitted in August and January of each year, beginning each academic semester. Mid-term admissions are considered and often accepted. All applicants are reviewed by the Admissions Office and approved by the Admissions Committee, composed of academic and military department representatives.

Tuition 
The fees for the entire year are $24,645. This covers room, board, tuition, lab fees, haircuts, laundry, dry cleaning, and library fees. It does not cover the cost of uniforms or personal spending money. The uniforms cost for first-year cadets is $2,500.00, including sales tax. For returning students who have their uniforms, the uniform charge is $500. The $250 application fee is used for registration administration and is non-refundable. Early enrollment and returning student discounts are deductible from the room, board, and tuition fees. Students from Alabama are also eligible for a discount. The Academy accepts students on a year-round basis; however, a major enrollment period occurs in January. The fees for late-enrolling students are prorated based on the date of enrollment.

Items not covered by tuition
Many items are not covered by tuition, such as the Flight Program, the Scuba Program, Drone Program, Wielding Program, Beta Club field trips, and Canteen.

Academics 
Southern Prep is on the Semester System (Block Schedule) with the student load for grades 9-12 consisting of eight courses per year. Class periods are 90 minutes long, which allows for more discussion, review, and classwork. This also allows the teacher to work with each student individually as needed. Students take final exams for their first four classes of the year before winter break and begin their following four classes in the second semester.

In keeping with the requirements of the State of Alabama, students are required to have four years of English, Maths, History, and Science. Other courses are offered as electives. Qualified sophomores, juniors, and seniors are eligible to take Advanced Placement and dual enrollment classes. A student can earn 6 to 8 credits per year. A student must have 24 credits to graduate.

Junior High School (grades 6-8) is also on the Semester System. Courses are taken for the full school year and are split into 45-minute classes. The usual class load is seven classes.

Cadet life

Band(No longer active)
The Southern Prep Band program typically allows students to take band classes designed to improve their individual and ensemble performing skills. However, as of 2021, the Band program has been shut down until further notice. Band members have performed for parades, dedications, and civic events each year. Past performances by the Lyman Ward Band include participation in the Talladega 500(1980–1990), Mardis Gras(1980–1986), the National Veterans Day Parade in Birmingham, Alabama(1980–2012), the Peanut Festival in Dothan, Alabama(1980–1990), as well as several command performances for the Governor of Alabama including the 2006 Inaugural Parade. The Band also often performed at Christmas parades in Opelika and Alexander City.

Drum Corps
The Southern Prep Drum Corps consists of 3-10 cadets led by the Drum Major, who was typically the longest participating member of the Drum Corps. The three types of drums the Drum Corps plays include snare, bass drum, and quads. The Drum Corps perform with the Color Guard, the Drill Team, and sometimes the Drum Corps performs with the Sword Drill team. Members of the Drum Corps are awarded the Drum Corps chord, arc, and, ribbon after their first performance.

Homecoming
Each year, Homecoming activities are held throughout the designated weekend. Special activities include a Homecoming Court with the crowning of the Homecoming Queen at the Friday Night Football game.

Drill Team
The Drill Team is open to all cadets in 9-12th grade and competes in several state and national competitions throughout the school year. Drill Team consists of 16 cadets and is led by two cadets, assigned as Drill Team Commander, and Deputy Drill Commander. The Drill Team is taught and supervised by the Commandant. Members of the Drill Team are Awarded the Drill Team cord, ribbon, and, arc after their first performance.

Rifle Team
The Rifle Team is open to all cadets 9-12th grade who have a strong desire to compete on a high school level with air rifles. Currently, the Rifle Team shoots in the sportier division and competes with Daisy 853 air rifles. The rifle team competes in the Alabama Northeast Area JROTC Rifle League. The league is recognized and uses the National Rifle Association rules for air rifles. The team competes every year in the Auburn University War Eagle Invitational where schools from Alabama, Tennessee, Georgia, and Florida compete for two days in the air rifle competitions. In 2006, the team came in 3rd at the War Eagle Invitational. The Rifle Team members are awarded the Rifle Team cord, ribbon, and, arc after their first competition. They can also be awarded marksman, sharpshooter, and expert badges.

Currently, one rifle team, Team A, consists of five shooters. The team practice after school Monday, Tuesday, and, Thursday.

Color Guard
The Color Guard is open to all cadets from 9th to 12th grade who are in the appropriate height range. Currently, the Color Guard competes in the Armed Color Guard Category and competes each year in different JROTC competitions around the state. The Color Guard performs a variety of activities on campus including Posting the Colors at all home sporting events, all promotion ceremonies, and scrub graduations. The Color Guard is known in the community for Posting the Colors at the Pearson Elementary school in Alexander City for Veterans Day and at the Dadeville Elementary School Veterans Day Program. The members of the Color Guard are awarded the Color Guard cord, the ACU ark,  ribbon, and arc.

The Color Guard also carries the colors at all on and off-campus parades.

Sword Drill
The Sword Drill Team contains 16 cadets, as well as a deputy commander and a commander.  Sword Drill is open to all cadets in 9th-11th grade. Sword Drill members sacrifice their nightly free time for several months to learn the Sword Drill Performance, which is passed down by the cadets from year to year, with no staff or faculty involvement. The Sword Drill Team typically performs only once, at the end of the year on Military Day. An exception to this was the 2021 Sword Drill Team which performed at a banquet hosted by the Auburn Marriott resort and spa at the Grand National, though this has not been done since. The Sword Drill Performance is a fifteen-minute silent drill performance, where members perform a memorized routine with no verbal commands. Sword Drill is the most prestigious activity on campus, with traditions being kept as close secrets by members. The sword Drill Members receive the Sword Drill cord and the Sword Drill arc. There is no Sword Drill ribbon.

Athletics

Football
Football has long been considered the favorite sport at Southern Prep. The Rangers compete as an independent team playing both 8-man and 11-man football against both public and private teams mostly from Alabama and Georgia. Southern Prep currently has both a Varsity and Junior Varsity team. At home games, a cannon is fired for each touchdown scored by the Rangers, as well as the opening kick-off.

Southern Prep Academy had its best season in 1966 under Coach J.D. Gooden going 8-1. However, in 2019, Coach Roland Bell led the Rangers to an 8-4 record which included winning the NHSA 8-Man Division II National Championship.

Presently, the Academy fields two teams -  at the varsity (Senior School) level and one at the Junior Varsity (Junior School) level. The varsity teams are composed of student-athletes in grades 9-12; the Junior Varsity program is designed for student-athletes in grades 6–8. All teams play a full interscholastic schedule.

The varsity teams play a competitive 8–12 game schedule, with games beginning in mid-August and ending in mid-November.  The Junior Varsity team plays a 10–12 game schedule.

Basketball
Basketball practice begins in mid-to-late October and is open to all interested students. Typically, 40 young men participate in one of the Academy's two teams as players, managers, and scorekeepers. The basketball program affords a great opportunity for participation at each athlete's level of playing ability. In the last five years, LWMA basketball players have received scholarship offers from such institutions as Atlanta Christian College and Montreat College in North Carolina.

Soccer
Southern Prep has a great tradition in soccer, dating back many years. It was one of the first two high schools in the State of Alabama to field an interscholastic soccer team. In recent history, Southern Prep was crowned as state champions in 2010 (AISA) with a 12-1-0 record and Area Champs in 2009. All home soccer games have been broadcast live on the Academy's website by the Multimedia Club since 2011.

Baseball
Baseball has been a Varsity sport at the Academy since the Spring of 2010. A new on-campus baseball field was scheduled to be completed in time for the start of the 2014 baseball season. Southern Prep competes as a Class AAA member of the Alabama Independent School Association.

Cross Country
Southern Prep has a very strong Varsity and Junior Varsity cross country team. Southern Prep participates in the AISA league. Members practice on 1 mile, 3k, and 5k trails on campus.

Cadet Formations 

The Cadet Corps will fall into formations between important times of the day. Such as between school and mess, before parades, and when the cadets return to the barracks.

Structure
The Cadet Battalion is organized by rank and position. Leading the formation is the Battalion Commander. Behind the Battalion Commander is the Battalion Executive officer, then the Command Seargent Major. There are 3 companies in the battalion, Bravo, Charlie and, Echo. The 3 companies are based on age, Bravo Company is made up of 11th grade and 12th grade. While Charlie Company is made up of 10th grade and 9th grade. Echo Company is made up of 6th-grade 7th grade and 8th grade. The three companies compete for the Best Drilled Company award every time a parade takes place. Squad leaders are chosen by the company CO and First Sgt. There are typically four squads in a company however, if a company is particularly large it will have more squads.

References

https://www.lwma.org/- Southern Prep Website
https://alumni.lwma.org/ - SII/LWMA/SPA Alumni Association Website
https://generalaviationnews.com/2018/04/12/lyman-ward-military-academy-makes-the-grade/
Lyman Ward Military School Information
Historical Marker Database - Lyman Ward Military Academy

Military high schools in the United States
Educational institutions established in 1898
Education in Tallapoosa County, Alabama
Buildings and structures in Tallapoosa County, Alabama
Private high schools in Alabama
Private middle schools in Alabama
1898 establishments in Alabama